Michael van der Ham (born 1985, Giessenburg) is a Dutch womenswear designer who graduated from Central Saint Martins in 2009.

He has designed costumes for Björk and Tori Amos as well as for the 2012 Summer Olympics Opening Ceremony.

Collaborations
Michael van der Ham For Brora 2012.<ref>{{cite web|url=http://www.vogue.co.uk/news/2012/10/26/michael-van-der-ham-brora-collection---pictures |title=Michael Van Der Ham Brora Collection - Pictures (Vogue.com UK) |publisher=Vogue.co.uk |date=2012-10-26 

Marks & Spencer 2016

The designer stopped showing at London Fashion Week in 2015, but teamed up with Sophia Webster to design dresses to accompany her shoes for S/S 18.

References

External links
 

1985 births
Living people
Alumni of Central Saint Martins
Dutch fashion designers
People from Giessenlanden